During the 1975–76 Scottish football season, Celtic competed in the Scottish Premier Division.

Competitions

Scottish Premier Division

League table

Matches

Scottish Cup

Scottish League Cup

European Cup Winners' Cup

Glasgow Cup

Final delayed until the following season

References

Celtic F.C. seasons
Celtic